The 1964/65 NTFL season was the 44th season of the Northern Territory Football League (NTFL).

Nightcliff have won their third premiership title while defeating Darwin in the grand final by 39 points. The Tigers did not win another premiership until the 2018/19 season.

Grand Final

References 

Northern Territory Football League seasons
NTFL